Helvey is an extinct town in Reynolds County, in the U.S. state of Missouri.

A post office called Helvey was established in 1915, and remained in operation until 1917. The community has the name of Cyrus and G. B. Helvey, early settlers.

References

Ghost towns in Missouri
Former populated places in Reynolds County, Missouri